Miss Spain (Spanish: Miss España) is a national beauty pageant in Spain that selects Spanish representatives to compete in three of the big four major international beauty pageants: the Miss Universe, Miss World, and Miss International competitions.

History

Miss Spain: 1929–2011
The origins of Miss Spain date back to 1929, when early contests took place until the advent of civil war in 1936, followed by the dictatorship of Francisco Franco, which did not permit beauty pageants until 1961.

The winner of Miss Spain is sent to represent her country in Miss Universe. However, if Miss Spain is underage, a runner-up is sent to Miss Universe. Overall in these international pageants, Spain's success has been moderate with one Miss Universe title in 1974 and three Miss International titles in 1977, 1990 and 2008.

Miss Universe Spain and Miss World Spain: 2013–present
After the inactivity of Miss Spain contest, the company Be Beautiful Spain, S.L. was created by Guillermo Escobar García, former worker of Miss Spain and who founded the contests Miss Spain Universe and Miss Spain World. In 2013, the pageant is separated into several pageants - like Miss World Spain and Miss Universe Spain. In the year 2018, after seven years of inactivity, the contest Miss Spain returns with Pedro Quesada as president and with Juncal Rivero as general director. The national director for Spain at Miss Universe, in 2019, is Jorge Diez Vanila. The national directors for Spain at both Miss World and Miss International are Cres del Olmo and Daniel Montesdeoca.

In 2020, the Be Miss Org. dissociated itself from the Miss Universe Organization. Later on, Cres del Olmo and Daniel Montesdeoca from the Nuestra Belleza España Organization franchise the Miss Universe license, in addition to the licenses for both Miss World and Miss International.

Titleholders
The winner of Miss España represents her country at Miss Universe. On occasion, when the winner does not qualify (due to age) for either contest, a runner-up is sent. Sometimes, the winner can also compete at Miss World and Miss Europe if the winner will be available to compete by the Miss España Organization. However, Miss España Organization was claimed to bankrupt in 2012, and separated into several independent contests choosing the representatives in the International beauty pageants like Miss World Spain (Miss España Mundo) and Miss Universe Spain (Miss España Universo).

Resigned
Took over title
Patricia Yurena Rodríguez originally won Miss Spain 2008 but due to age requirements was unable to compete at Miss Universe and was subsequently replaced by Claudia Moro. Rodríguez instead represented Spain at Miss World. Rodríguez later won Miss Universe Spain 2013 represented Spain at Miss Universe 2013.

Ranking

Miss España (1929-2011)

Miss Universo España (2013-present)

Winners' gallery

Titleholders under Miss España

Miss Universo España

From 1960-2012, the winner of Miss Spain represents her country at the Miss Universe. On occasion, when the winner does not qualify (due to age) for either contest, a runner-up is sent. In 2013, the BE MISS ORG. took over the franchise of Miss Universe and the winner of Be Miss Universo España participates at Miss Universe competition. Since 2020, the Nuestra Belleza España Organization handles the Miss Universe license.

Miss Mundo España

Before 2012 either the winner or the First Runner-up of Miss Spain represented her country at the Miss World. Due to economic problems in Spain in 2011, the Miss España went bankrupt. From 2013-2016, the official candidate was selected by "Miss World Spain / Miss Mundo España" pageant, by the BE MISS ORG. Since 2017, the Nuestra Belleza España Organization handles the Miss World license.

Miss Internacional España

Before 2012 the Second Runner-up of Miss Spain represented her country at the Miss International. Since 2013 the official Miss Internacional España set the independent pageant to crown new winner to Miss International after the organization of Miss España bankruptcy.

See also

Míster España
Miss Earth Spain
Spain at major beauty pageants

References

External links
 Be Miss Organization
 MISS ESPANA
 Nuestra Belleza España Organization
 Miss Universe Spain

 
Spain
Spain
Spain
Recurring events established in 1929
Spanish awards